Neuracanthus is a genus of plants in the family Acanthaceae.

Species
, Plants of the World Online accepted the following species:

Neuracanthus aculeatus Balf.f.
Neuracanthus africanus T.Anderson ex S.Moore
Neuracanthus argyrophyllus Chiov.
Neuracanthus brachystachyus Benoist
Neuracanthus capitatus Balf.f.
Neuracanthus cladanthacanthus Chiov.
Neuracanthus decorus S.Moore
Neuracanthus gracilior S.Moore
Neuracanthus grandiflorus Kurz
Neuracanthus keniensis J.-P.Lebrun & Stork
Neuracanthus leandrii Benoist
Neuracanthus lindaui C.B.Clarke
Neuracanthus madagascariensis Benoist
Neuracanthus mahajangensis Bidgood & Brummitt
Neuracanthus matsabdianus Bidgood & Brummitt
Neuracanthus migiurtinus Bidgood & Brummitt
Neuracanthus neesianus C.B.Clarke
Neuracanthus niveus S.Moore
Neuracanthus ovalifolius (Fiori) Bidgood & Brummitt
Neuracanthus pedalis Bidgood & Brummitt
Neuracanthus pictus M.G.Gilbert
Neuracanthus polyacanthus (Lindau) C.B.Clarke
Neuracanthus richardianus (Nees) Boivin ex Benoist
Neuracanthus robecchii (Lindau) C.B.Clarke
Neuracanthus scaber S.Moore
Neuracanthus sphaerostachyus (Nees) Dalzell
Neuracanthus spinosus Deflers
Neuracanthus subuninervis Kurz
Neuracanthus tephrophyllus Bidgood & Brummitt
Neuracanthus tetragonostachyus Nees
Neuracanthus ukambensis C.B.Clarke
Neuracanthus umbraticus Bidgood & Brummitt

References

Acanthaceae
Acanthaceae genera
Taxonomy articles created by Polbot